Microbiology is a monthly peer-reviewed scientific journal that covers research in all aspects of microbiology, including the biochemistry, cell biology, molecular biology, developmental biology, physiology, pathogenicity, biodiversity, biotechnology, evolution, and genetics of microorganisms and their viruses. It also covers plant-microbe interactions, and environmental and theoretical microbiology. The journal is published monthly by the Microbiology Society. It was established in January 1947 as the Journal of General Microbiology and obtained its current name in 1994. Since 2020, the editor-in-chief is Gavin H. Thomas  (University of York), who took over from Tanya Parish (Seattle Children's), who served since 2015. The microbiologist and science writer Sir John Postgate FRS was editor from 1969 to 1974.

Abstracting and indexing
The journal is abstracted and indexed in:
BIOSIS Previews
Current Contents/Life Sciences
Science Citation Index
Scopus
According to the  Retrieved 2021-08-22, the journal has a impact factor of 2.7 (2-year Journal Impact Factor).

References

External links

Microbiology journals
Delayed open access journals
Publications established in 1947
Monthly journals
English-language journals
Microbiology Society academic journals